Grantham Killingworth (1699–1778) was an English lay Baptist controversialist.

Life
A grandson of Thomas Grantham, he was born in Norwich. He was a layman, and a personal friend of William Whiston, whom he supplied with evidence of cures effected through "prayer, fasting, and annointing with oyl" by a Unitarian Baptist minister, William Barron (died 7 February 1731, aged 51).

Killingworth died in 1778, leaving an endowment to the Priory Yard General Baptist chapel, in Norwich.

Works
Killingworth wrote on the perpetuity of baptism, against Thomas Emlyn; in favour of adult baptism, against John Taylor, and Michajah Towgood; and on close communion, against James Foster, John Wiche, and Charles Bulkley. His publications include:

 A Supplement to the Sermons … at Salters' Hall against Popery, 1735; 3rd ed. 1736; 5th ed. 1738, with appendices, including his answer to Emlyn's Previous Question, 1710.
 An Examination, 1741, of Foster's Discourse (1744) on "catholic communion".
 An Answer to the Defence of Dr. Foster, 1752, (the Defence was by "Philocatholicus", i.e. John Wiche). 
 An Answer to Mr. Charles Bulkley's Pleas for Mixt Communion, 1756.
 A Letter … to the late … Mr. Whiston, 1757.

Notes

Attribution

1699 births
1778 deaths
English Baptists
Clergy from Norwich